Linette is both a given name and a surname. Notable people with the name include:

Linette Beaumont, British actress
Magda Linette (born 1992), Polish tennis player
Lynette and Lyonesse, two sisters in Arthurian legend

See also
Lanette

Feminine given names